Last Mountain may refer to:

Last Mountain (Saskatchewan), a mountain in Saskatchewan
Last Mountain Lake, formally known as Long Lake, a lake in south central Saskatchewan
Last Mountain Creek, a river in Saskatchewan
Last Mountain House Provincial Park, a park in Saskatchewan
Last Mountain Lake Bird Sanctuary, Saskatchewan
Last Mountain Lake National Wildlife Area, Saskatchewan
Rural Municipality of Last Mountain Valley No. 250, a rural municipality in Saskatchewan
Last Mountain Regional Park, a regional park in Saskatchewan
Last Mountain Lake 80A, Indian Reserve in Saskatchewan
Currahee Mountain, the last (or southernmost) mountain in the Blue Ridge range, in Stephens County, Georgia

Electoral districts
Last Mountain (electoral district), a federal electoral district in Saskatchewan
Last Mountain-Touchwood, a provincial electoral district for the Legislative Assembly of Saskatchewan
Last Mountain (provincial electoral district), a former electoral district

In film
The Last Mountain, a 2011 American film

Other
Last Mountain Railway, a railway in Saskatchewan